Daniel D. Tompkins (June 21, 1774 – June 11, 1825) was an American politician. He was the fifth governor of New York from 1807 to 1817, and the sixth vice president of the United States from 1817 to 1825.

Born in Scarsdale, New York, Tompkins practiced law in New York City after graduating from Columbia College. He was a delegate to the 1801 New York constitutional convention and served on the New York Supreme Court from 1804 to 1807. In 1807, he defeated incumbent Morgan Lewis to become the Governor of New York. He held that office from 1807 to 1817, serving for the duration of the War of 1812. During the war, he often spent his own money to equip and pay the militia when the legislature was not in session, or would not approve the necessary funds.

Tompkins was the Democratic-Republican Party's vice presidential nominee in the 1816 presidential election. The ticket of James Monroe and Tompkins easily prevailed over limited Federalist opposition. He served as vice president from 1817 to 1825, and was the only 19th century vice president to serve two full terms, and was also the only vice president to serve a full eight years, until Thomas R. Marshall, 96 years later. In 1820, he sought another term as Governor of New York, but was defeated by DeWitt Clinton. After the War of 1812, Tompkins was in poor physical and financial health, the latter condition stemming largely from his spending for the military effort during the War of 1812. He fell into alcoholism and was unable to re-establish fiscal solvency despite winning partial reimbursement from the federal government in 1823. He died 99 days after completing a second term and leaving office.

Name
Tompkins was baptized Daniel Tompkins, but added the middle initial "D." while a student at Columbia College to distinguish himself from another Daniel Tompkins who was a student there. There is controversy as to what the middle initial stood for; some have suggested "Decius." The generally accepted conclusion is that it did not stand for anything, and served only to distinguish him from the other Daniel Tompkins.

Early life, family, and career

Daniel D. Tompkins was born on June 21, 1774 in Scarsdale, Westchester County, New York, at his home, the estate of Fox Meadow. His parents were Sarah Ann (Hyatt) and Jonathan Griffin Tompkins. His older brother, Caleb Tompkins was a United States representative from 1817 to 1821. Daniel Tompkins graduated from Columbia College in New York City in 1795, and then studied law with James Kent and Peter Jay Munro. He was admitted to the bar in 1797, and practiced in New York City. Despite the Federalist leanings of Kent and Munro, Tompkins entered politics as a Democratic-Republican. He was a delegate to the New York State Constitutional Convention in 1801, and a member of the New York State Assembly in 1804. He was elected to the 9th United States Congress, but resigned before the beginning of the term to accept, at age 30, an appointment as associate justice of the New York Supreme Court of Judicature, in which capacity he served from 1804 to 1807.

On February 20, 1798, Daniel Tompkins, 23, married 16-year-old Hannah Minthorne, the daughter of Mangle Minthorne, an assistant alderman of New York City. The couple had eight children, including Arietta Minthorn Tompkins (born July 31, 1800), who married a son of Smith Thompson in 1818, and (Mangle) Minthorne Tompkins (December 26, 1807 – June 5, 1881), who was the Free Soil Party candidate for Governor of New York in 1852.  The Tompkinses also fostered Henry Brewerton (1801–1879), who was orphaned at a young age.  Brewerton entered West Point in 1813, served as an engineer officer during the American Civil War and retired from the Army in 1867.

The Tompkinsville section of Staten Island was named after him; in 1815, Tompkins established a settlement along the eastern shore of the island with the purchase of the Van Buskirk Farm in New Brighton and property on Grymes Hill. His main residence was located on Fort Hill, near Fort Place which burned down in 1874.

Their children Hannah and Minthorne were named after their mother, and Hannah and Minthorne streets in Staten Island are named for them. Staten Island's Westervelt Avenue is named for daughter Hannah's husband. Hannah was ill in the year before her husband became vice president, and did not attend his inauguration. She survived him by nearly four years in Tompkinsville, Staten Island.

Governor
 
On April 30, 1807, he defeated the incumbent Governor Morgan LewisTompkins received 35,074 votes, Lewis 30,989 – and remained in office as Governor of New York until 1817. He was reelected in 1810, defeating Jonas PlattTompkins received 43,094 votes, Jonas Platt received 36,484. In 1813 he defeated Stephen Van RensselaerTompkins received 43,324 votes, Van Rensselaer received 39,718and in 1816, he beat Rufus KingTompkins received 45,412 votes, King received 38,647. Tompkins was supported by DeWitt Clinton in his first run for office, but Tompkins later broke with Clinton by supporting James Madison over Clinton in the 1808 presidential election.

During the War of 1812, Tompkins proved to be one of the most effective war governors. He played an important role in reorganizing the state militia and promoted the formation of a standing state military force based on select conscription. He declined an appointment as United States Secretary of State by President James Madison in 1814, instead accepting appointment as commander of the federal military district that included New York City.

Tompkins was also elected a member of the American Antiquarian Society in 1814.

In 1815 Tompkins established a settlement along the eastern shore of Staten Island that came to be called Tompkinsville. He built a dock along the waterfront in the neighborhood in 1817 and began offering daily steam ferry service between Staten Island and Manhattan. In 1816 he purchased much of the land later known as Tompkinsville from the Church of St. Andrew, but his financial troubles later led the church to foreclose. His son-in-law and daughter, Dr. John S. and Hannah Westervelt then bought the property, which they later divided into many lots to sell off.

In 1817, Governor Tompkins suggested that July 4, 1827, be set as the date on which all slaves in New York state—including those who were born before the Gradual Manumission Act of July 4, 1799, (and who were therefore not eligible for freedom)—should be freed. This was subsequently marked by African Americans in the state by a Fifth of July celebration.

Vice presidency (1817–1825)
Many New York Democratic-Republicans supported Tompkins for president in the 1816 presidential election, but James Monroe received the party's nomination. Tompkins was instead elected Vice President as Monroe's running mate. Tompkins was re-elected in 1820. He served from March 4, 1817, to March 4, 1825. In April 1820, while serving as vice president, he ran for Governor of New York against incumbent DeWitt Clinton. Tompkins lost, 45,900 votes to 47,447. He was a delegate to the 1821 New York State Constitutional Convention, serving as its president.
When Tompkins became vice president, he was in poor health, due to a fall from a horse on November 3, 1814. His finances were also quite poor. During the War of 1812, he had personally financed New York's war effort with borrowed money, but did not adequately document his expenses. Both the New York legislature and the federal government refused him full reimbursement. He also slipped into alcoholism. With poor physical and financial health, Tompkins spent much of his vice presidency outside of Washington, D.C., and made for a poor presiding officer of the Senate while it debated the Missouri Compromise in 1820. In 1823, Tompkins finally won compensation from the federal government, but he continued to drink heavily and was unable to resolve his business affairs.

Personal Life 
Apart from his political career, Tompkins served as the first Sovereign Grand Commander of the Northern Masonic Jurisdiction Scottish Rite, a branch of Freemasonry. Tompkins served in this capacity from 1813-1825, although he did not devote much time to the newly formed group.

Death

Tompkins died in Tompkinsville on June 11, 1825, 10 days before his 51st birthday. He had the shortest lifespan of any vice president. He was interred in the Minthorne vault in the west yard of St. Mark's Church in-the-Bowery, New York City, as was his wife. His post-vice presidency lifespan is the shortest of any US vice president, and he also lived the shortest life of any US vice president. He was the youngest US vice president until John C. Breckinridge took office in 1857 at 36, and the only 19th-century vice president to serve two terms under the same president, and two full terms at all. (George Clinton died in his second term, and John Calhoun resigned before the end of his.)

Legacy

The Tompkinsville neighborhood of Staten Island is named for Tompkins, and the streets in that neighborhood are named for his children. There is also a Masonic lodge in the town named for him. Tompkins is credited with being one of the founding members of the Brighton Heights Reformed Church on Staten Island. The church was founded in 1823, during his term as vice president. Its first meeting place was in New York Marine Hospital (then known as the Quarantine), a predecessor of the immigration facility on Ellis Island.

Four forts in New York State in the War of 1812 were named for Governor Tompkins, in Staten Island, Sackets Harbor, Buffalo, and Plattsburgh.

Tompkins Park in Bedford Stuyvesant, Brooklyn, New York (now called Herbert Von King Park) was named after Tompkins. The nearby Tompkins Avenue and Tompkins Public Houses are likewise named.

Tompkins County in New York, Tompkins Square Park in Manhattan, Public School 69 Daniel D. Tompkins School in Staten Island, and the Town of Tompkins are named after him, as is Tompkins Road, running between Post Road (NY-22) and Fenimore Road in Scarsdale, New York.

Tompkinsville, Kentucky, is named for Tompkins. It is the county seat of Monroe County, Kentucky, which is named for the president under whom Tompkins served as vice president.

Tompkins was member of Hiram Lodge 72, Mount Pleasant, New York and became Grand Master of the Grand Lodge of New York from 1820 to 1822. The Daniel D. Tompkins Memorial Chapel at the Masonic Home in Utica, New York was built in his honor in 1911. The Grand Lodge of New York celebrated the centennial of the chapel on June 25, 2011.

Tompkins was mentioned by Kris Kringle in the 1947 film Miracle on 34th Street. The screenplay was incorrect, however, in that Kringle mentions that Tompkins served as vice president under John Quincy Adams when Adams's vice president was actually John C. Calhoun. Tompkins was the sixth vice president and Adams was the sixth president, leading to confusion in the script.

American actor and producer Richard Kollmar, husband of columnist and TV personality Dorothy Kilgallen, was a great-great-grandchild of Tompkins.

References

External links

 
 Public papers of Daniel D. Tompkins, governor of New York, 1807–1817, Volume 3 (online)

|-

|-

|-

|-

|-

1774 births
1825 deaths
19th-century vice presidents of the United States
1816 United States vice-presidential candidates
1820 United States vice-presidential candidates
American Presbyterians
Burials in New York (state)
Columbia College (New York) alumni
Democratic-Republican Party state governors of the United States
Democratic-Republican Party vice presidents of the United States
Governors of New York (state)
Members of the American Antiquarian Society
American people of English descent
Members of the New York State Assembly
Monroe administration cabinet members
New York (state) Democratic-Republicans
New York (state) lawyers
New York Supreme Court Justices
People from Scarsdale, New York
People from Staten Island
Vice presidents of the United States
Members of the New York Manumission Society